Jacques de Milly was the 37th Grand Master of the Order of the Knights Hospitaller from 1454 until 1461, when he died.

References

External links
 http://www.smom-za.org/grandmasters/37.htm

Grand Masters of the Knights Hospitaller
1461 deaths
15th-century French people
Year of birth unknown